Lost Lagoon is a 1958 American drama film directed by John Rawlins and written by Milton Subotsky, John Rawlins and Jeffrey Lynn. The film stars Jeffrey Lynn, Lelia Barry, Peter Donat, Don Gibson, Roger Clark and Jane Hartley. The film was released in February 1958 by United Artists.

Plot
Presumed lost at sea in a storm, a man washes up in the Bahamas where he finds a new life and love. But guilt and an insurance agent may cut his dream short.

Cast 
Jeffrey Lynn as Charlie Walker
Lelia Barry as Elizabeth Moore
Peter Donat as David Burnham
Don Gibson as Mr. Beakins
Roger Clark as Millard Cauley
Jane Hartley as Bernadine Walker
Celeste Robinson as Colima
Stanley Seymour as Native
Isabelle Jones as Native
Hubert Smith as Himself

References

External links 
 

1958 films
United Artists films
American adventure drama films
1950s adventure drama films
Films directed by John Rawlins
1958 drama films
1950s English-language films
1950s American films